Moth is a town and a nagar panchayat in Jhansi district in the Indian state of Uttar Pradesh.

Demographics
 India census, Moth had a population of 30,000. Males constitute 53% of the population and females 47%. Moth has an average literacy rate of 64%, higher than the national average of 59.5%: male literacy is 71%, and female literacy is 57%. In Moth, 15% of the population is under 0–6 years of age.

References

Cities and towns in Jhansi district